Mormoops is a genus of bat in the family Mormoopidae. It contains the following species:

 Antillean ghost-faced bat (Mormoops blainvillii)
 Giant ghost-faced bat (†Mormoops magna)
 Ghost-faced bat (Mormoops megalophylla)

References

 
Bat genera
Taxa named by William Elford Leach
Taxonomy articles created by Polbot